Tomáš Stúpala (born 5 May 1966 in Bratislava) is a former Slovak football player.

Career
He played club football for ŠK Slovan Bratislava. He earned 14 caps for the Slovak national football team from 1994 to 1995.

After he retired from playing, became a football coach. He was appointed assistant manager of ŠK Slovan's B side in 2008.

References

External links

1966 births
Living people
Slovak footballers
Slovakia international footballers
ŠK Slovan Bratislava players
FK Dukla Banská Bystrica players
Footballers from Bratislava

Association football fullbacks